Huvi Hjalmar Tuiskunen (22 July 1872 – 31 March 1930) was a Finnish sport shooter, who competed at the 1908 and 1912 Summer Olympics, and won a Finnish championship in 1907.

Shooting 

He received the first Finnish national championship gold in shooting, when he won the 300 metre free rifle event in 1907.

He represented the club Suomen Metsästysyhdistys.

He was at the constituting meeting of the Finnish Shooting Sport Federation.

Personal 

He was born in Luhtikylä, Orimattila. He moved to farm in Helsinki in 1898. He moved to open a sports utility shop in Lahti in 1922.

He is buried in the Mustankallio cemetery in Lahti.

He is related to shooters Matti Nummela and Helena Juppala.

Sources

References

External links 
 

1872 births
1930 deaths
People from Orimattila
People from Uusimaa Province (Grand Duchy of Finland)
Finnish male sport shooters
ISSF rifle shooters
Running target shooters
Olympic shooters of Finland
Shooters at the 1908 Summer Olympics
Shooters at the 1912 Summer Olympics
Sportspeople from Päijät-Häme